I Loved an Armchair is a 1971 Greek film directed by Dinos Dimopoulos and produced by Karagiannis-Karatzopoulos S.A. starring Kostas Voutsas, Eleni Erimou and Giorgos Papazisis.  It was written by Lakis Mihailides and was based on the 1969 Russian film Twelve Chairs, which was also made into the 1970 American film The Twelve Chairs directed by Mel Brooks.  The music director in the movie was Giorgos Hadjinassiou.

The film is 89 minutes long and tells the story of a poor young man who was forced to sell four chairs he had inherited from his aunt and then learned that one of them contained hidden jewelry.

Cast
Kostas Voutsas as Grigoris Karouzos
Eleni Erimou as Kaiti
Giorgos Papazisis as Triandafilos
Stavros Xenidis as a psychiatrist
Athinodoros Prousalis
Babis Anthopoulos as a director
Giorgos Tzifos as an assistant director
Katerina Gioulaki as Zeta
Giorgos Moschidis as Miltos Karnezis
Maria Foka as aunt Vangelitsa
Nikitas Platis as Dimitrios Nikolaou
Kostas Palios as a judge president
Stelios Christoforidis
Grigoris Dekakis
Kostas Fatouros
Kostas Fyssoun
Thanos Grammenos
Ilias Kapetanidis
Giorgos Messalas
Panos Nikolakopoulos
Nikos Paschalidis
Nick Spyridonakos
Alekos Zartaloudis

External links
 

1971 films
Greek comedy films
1970s Greek-language films
Films directed by Dinos Dimopoulos